Triple Play 99 (TP99) is a baseball video game featuring Major League Baseball rosters current from January 15, 1998 and stats from the 1997 season. Seattle Mariners shortstop Alex Rodriguez is featured on the cover.

The game has all 30 Major League Baseball teams including the newly added Arizona Diamondbacks and Tampa Bay Devil Rays. Triple Play 99 adds 3D hardware support, a career mode, a manager mode and a league-wide draft.

TP99 includes all of the real stadiums, including Bank One Ballpark and Tropicana Field, except for the Kingdome (Seattle Mariners), which no longer exists, and three secret stadiums.

Injuries are also included in TP99. Players can accidentally collide when trying to catch the ball and fall over. Players may unexpectedly have an injury while playing as well, and the game will require that the team bring in a substitute. Pitchers can also lose their stamina faster than normal, making things even tougher. The game does have a stamina meter, and also shows a count of how many pitches the pitcher has thrown, how many balls, strikes, hits, home runs allowed, and walks.

Reception

The PC version received "favorable" reviews, while the PlayStation version received "average" reviews, according to the review aggregation website GameRankings. In Japan, where the latter console version was ported and published under the name  on November 12, 1998, Famitsu gave it a score of 19 out of 40.

References

Further reading

External links
 

1998 video games
Triple Play video games
PlayStation (console) games
Windows games